This is a list of beaches in South Korea.

 Haeundae Beach, Busan
 Gwangalli Beach, Busan
 Songdo Beach, Busan
 Dadaepo Beach, Busan
 Gyeongpo Beach, Gangneung
 Daecheon Beach, Boryeong
 Eulwangri Beach, Yeongjongdo, Incheon
 Wangsan Beach, Yeongjongdo, Incheon
 Hanagae Beach, Muuido
 Hyeopjae Beach, Jeju Island
 Jungmoon Beach, Jeju Island

References

South Korea
Beaches
Beaches